Gustavia may refer to

 Gustavia, Saint Barthélemy, the largest town on (and capital of) the Caribbean island of St. Barthélemy
 Gustavia, Rügen, an unfinished town project in Swedish Pomerania
 Gustavia (plant), a genus of plants in the family Lecythidaceae 
 Gustavia (arachnid), a genus of arachnids in the family Gustaviidae
People with the name include:
 Gustavia Lui, New Zealand businesswoman